2011–12 Pirveli Liga  was the 23rd season of the Georgian Pirveli Liga. The season began on 23 August 2011 and finished on 27 May 2012.

Format 

In the first stage, the teams divided into two groups: A and B. Each of the 10 teams. Groups in the first and second place teams (of four), will fight Umaglesi Liga for the transition. The remaining 16 teams will continue to struggle to maintain a place in the league.

Teams

League tables

I round

A Group

B Group

II Round

A Group

B Group

See also 
 2011–12 Umaglesi Liga
 2011–12 Georgian Cup

External links
 Results, fixtures, tables at Soccerway

Erovnuli Liga 2 seasons
2011–12 in Georgian football
Georgia